Miriam Doblas Muñoz (born 1 April 1992), known professionally as Lola Índigo, is a Spanish singer and dancer. She rose to prominence in 2017, with her participation in series nine of the Spanish reality television talent competition Operación Triunfo. She was one of first participants to be eliminated from the talent show. After exiting the show, the singer signed with Universal Music and released her debut single "Ya No Quiero Ná" which turned into a smash-hit in her country, peaking at number three on the PROMUSICAE musical chart and selling more than a hundred thousand copies. It was certified as three times platinum. Her short but intense musical career has earned her multiple awards such as an MTV Europe Music Award for Best Spanish Act in 2019.

Early life 
Doblas was born in April 1992 in Madrid but was raised in Huétor-Tajar, a small town in the province of Granada. She became interested in fine arts at an early age, highlighting her facet as dancer and choreographer. She worked as a dancing teacher and took part in some musicals. In 2010 she entered the Spanish dance television competition Fama Revolution where she left the fourth to last. Later on, she was also the back-up dancer for A-list artists like Chris Brown, Miguel Bosé, Enrique Iglesias, Marta Sánchez, The Baseballs and more outside Spain, most concretely in China, where she lived for three years, and in Los Angeles, where she took singing classes and formed herself more professionally.

In July 2017 she auditioned for Operación Triunfo, a music talent television contest that aired in La 1 after a six-year hiatus. The show began in October 2017 and became a media phenomenon in Spain. Its YouTube channel received over 561 million views from October to February 2018 and became the most commented space on Twitter in Spain surppasing Game of Thrones. After it ended, some of the contestants became instant national celebrities.

Career

2017–2018: Operación Triunfo 
In October 2017, the singer entered musical reality show contest Operación Triunfo. She left by the third week where she placed as sixteenth. After she left the contest, she did some concerts in Barcelona and Madrid, where she also played music as an amateur disc jockey. In January 2018 she offered her first official concert at the Sala Prince in Granada which sold-out. She sang OT2017's hymn "Camina"  at the 2018 Premios Forqué in Zaragoza, a professional film and television awards, alongside her fellow competitors. Universal Music offered Doblas to form a musical group with three other OT competitors that was meant to be named "Delta", which she declined after no songs worked for this project. Doblas co-headlined a 23-date arena concert tour with her fifteen talent show companions from March to December 2018. The tour, named OT 2017, (en concierto) was attended by over 300,000 people and visited Spain's largest indoor arenas and stadiums like the Palau Sant Jordi or the Santiago Bernabéu Stadium. In September 2018 she entered television competition of celebrity impersonations Tu Cara Me Suena, where she got the fourth position. In December she sang the Coca-Cola's Christmas campaign jingle "El Mundo Entero" alongside Aitana, Ana Guerra, Raoul Vázquez and Agoney.

2018–2019: Breakthrough with Akelarre 
In June 2018, Doblas announced her stage name "Lola Índigo". Lola Índigo, however, was first announced as a supergroup formed by Doblas and four dancers: Mónica Peña, Saydi Lubanzadio, Laura Ruiz y Claudia Riera. This band would mix singing and dancing with a mix of trap, reggueton and funk. On July 20, 2018, she released her debut single "Ya No Quiero Ná" through Universal Music. The song, produced by Belgian musician Bruno Valverde in Segovia, became an instant hit in Spain thanks to its contagious rhythm and feminist lyrics. It debuted at number three on the PROMUSICAE chart, being this its peak position. The music video for "Ya No Quiero Ná" had a very low budget; was filmed at the Juan Carlos I park in Madrid with an urban and very careful aesthetic in which dance is the protagonist. It received over a million views in a single day. As of April 2020, the song has been certified three times platinum. Universal Music expanded her single contract in order to release her debut studio album. In November 2018 she embarked on her first solo tour called "Índigo Tour" which began on November 3 in Granada and ended on March 23, 2019, in Toledo comprising 17 concerts.

Thus, throughout 2018 she started shaping her debut studio album. In December she released her second single "Mujer Bruja" which features Mala Rodríguez. The track peaked at number six in Spain. There she announced that her album would have a "witch theme". That same month she collaborated with multiple artists on the remix of Yera's "Borracha" and also released the "Ya No Quiero Ná" remix featuring Joey Montana and Charly Black. In the beginning of 2019 she collaborated with Movistar+ and dance television competition Fama a Bailar and sang the theme song "Fuerte" for the show's 2019 edition. She also worked there as a regular coach and performed a couple times. In April she collaborated with Mediaset and sang the main song for the 2019 film Lo Dejo Cuando Quiera, which turned to be "El Humo". These two songs were both released as promotional singles of her debut album. Later that month, she released "Maldición" featuring Colombian rapper Lalo Ebratt. On 17 May 2019, her album Akelarre (Basque for "witches' sabbath") was released after multiple delays. It debuted at the top position of the Spanish charts. Its respective tour began on May 4 at the FIBES Conference Center in Seville and ended on November 30 in Girona comprising 33 concerts.

In June she collaborated with Aitana on her song "Me Quedo" which was released as a single on June 28. On July 31, 2019, Índigo released "Lola Bunny", a non-album track that features Spanish novel rapper and actual boyfriend Don Patricio. Its upbeat rhythm and fast urban sound earned the song the fourth position on the PROMUSICAE chart. On August 8 she collaborated with Cupido on the remix of their song "Autoestima" which was constantly played by the MTV. In October 2019 she opened two concerts for Colombian megastar Sebastián Yatra in Ecuador and did a showcase in Bogotá. On December 6 she closed the 'Akelarre' era with a new song, "Luna". Lola Índigo will play her first solo arena concert on November 29, 2020, at the WiZink Center in Madrid. The show, titled 'Akelarre: la Noche de las Brujas' was scheduled to take place on May 2 but was delayed due to the ongoing coronavirus pandemic.

2020–present: Second studio album 
On March 27, 2020, Índigo released "4 Besos" featuring Rauw Alejandro and Lalo Ebratt, the lead single of her second album which is scheduled to be released in late 2020. In May a second collaboration with Mala Rodríguez titled "Problemas" was released as a track on Rodríguez's sixth studio album Mala. On June 10, the promotional single "Mala Cara" was released on streaming media and performed on the final gala of Operación Triunfo 2020. During summer season, Indigo released different collaborations. In July she united with Spanish urban singer Rvfv on "Trendy", which had its own challenge on TikTok and worked well on the charts. On August 28 her highly anticipated collaboration with Mexican and Chilean singers Danna Paola and Denise Rosenthal titled "Santería" was released online, peaking at 15 on the PROMUSICAE chart and became a top twenty hit in Chile. In September, Indigo entered the Billboard Argentina Hot 100 chart for the first time after releasing "High (Remix)" alongside Argentine singers María Becerra and Tini. The track was named "Best Latin Summer Remix of 2020" by Billboard and scored a Premios Gardel nomination for Best Trap/Urban Song or Album. A month later she collaborated with Spanish rapper Beret on "Cómo te Va?" and in November with Belén Aguilera in "La Tirita". In July, 2021 she released the song "La Niña de la Escuela" with Tini and Belinda, which was born right after the quarantine and created via Zoom  reaching the third position in Spanish iTunes charts. In August, she did an interview alongside Belinda with the fashion magazine Vanity Teen in which they both talked about the ways music changed their lives, how they faced difficult times while growing up, the joy of helping others and their latest international hit single "La Niña de la Escuela".

Discography

Studio albums

Singles

Promotional singles

Other charted songs

Other appearances

Tours 
Headlining
La Niña Tour (2021)
La Niña XXL Tour (2021-2022)

Co-headlining
Operación Triunfo 2017 en concierto (2017-2018)

Awards and nominations

References

External links
 
 
 Lola Índigo on Spotify

Singers from Madrid
Spanish women pop singers
Spanish women singer-songwriters
Spanish singer-songwriters
Spanish female dancers
Operación Triunfo contestants
Universal Music Group artists
21st-century Spanish singers
21st-century Spanish women singers
MTV Europe Music Award winners
Spanish LGBT rights activists
1992 births
Living people